Predator Free 2050 is a plan put forth by the New Zealand government with the goal of eradicating all of its  mammalian introduced predators by 2050.

Opposition to planned procedures associated with poisoning  feral  cats arose in September 2018.

Joint venture company 
Under the plan, the government invested NZ$28 million into a joint venture company, Predator Free 2050 Ltd, with a plan for an additional $1 added for each $2 invested by the public, third parties such as philanthropic foundations or local councils. It was later reported that they had also pledged an additional $7 million per year after the initial $28 million was provided over the first four years.

On 25 July 2017, Conservation Minister Maggie Barry spoke about the project, calling it "the most important conservation project in the history of our country" and also said that Predator Free 2050 Ltd was planning to announce the first major project it would be funding before the end of 2017.

Goals 
Aside from the stated goal of eradicating all predator species by 2050, the Department of Conservation has outlined four interim 2025 goals:
 Suppress predators on a further 1 million hectares.
 Eradicate predators from at least 20,000 hectares without the use of fences.
 Eradicate predators from island nature reserves.
 Achieve a breakthrough science solution capable of eradicating at least one small mammal predator.

Former Prime Minister John Key stated in mid 2016 that current technologies and methods would be insufficient for the ultimate goal of the project, and were banking on a 'new scientific breakthrough' to allow for the eradication of possums, stoats, and rats.

Supporting large-scale projects
PF2050 Ltd called for expressions of interest from parties that are capable and committed to achieving the Government’s ambitious goal to rid New Zealand of possums, rats and stoats by 2050. PF2050 wishes to identify regional/local councils, communities, mana whenua, businesses, NGOs and/or other entities who have predator eradication initiatives either underway or contemplated that can contribute toward meeting its interim (2025) goals identified above. A selection of projects will enter a request-for-proposal stage with the aim of approving the first projects for PF2050 investment by mid-February 2018.

Research strategy
In November 2017, Predator Free 2050 Ltd announced their research strategy. In contrast to previous speculative commentary, this is the officially approved approach being taken. The strategy outlines four concurrent programmes.
‘Environment and society’ will explore New Zealand’s social and cultural views about predator eradication. ‘Eradicating the last 1%’ focusses on upgrading current predator control approaches. ‘New genetic control tools’ aims to inform New Zealanders as to the benefits and risks of new genetic technologies prior to any commitment to develop such tools for Predator Free 2050. ‘Computer modelling’ will develop shared resources that all communities and agencies contributing to Predator Free 2050 can use to design the right approach for their goals and environment.

References

External links
 Department of Conservation Predator Free 2050 page 
 Predator Free 2050 Limited 

Invasive species in New Zealand
Conservation projects in New Zealand